Croisettes is a Lausanne Métro station and the northern terminus of M2 line. It was opened on 27 October 2008 as part of the inaugural section of the line, from Croisettes to Ouchy–Olympique. It is located in the municipality of Épalinges. The adjacent station is Vennes.

References

External links
 

Railway stations in Switzerland opened in 2008
Lausanne Metro stations